Silberfeld is a village and a former municipality in the district of Greiz, in Thuringia, Germany. Since 1 December 2011, it is part of the town Zeulenroda-Triebes.

References

Former municipalities in Thuringia